Emily Douglas may refer to:

 Emily Taft Douglas, (1899–1994) Democratic politician from Illinois and author
 Emily M. Douglas, academic and domestic violence expert
 Emily Elizabeth Douglas, (born 1982), founder and executive director of Grandma's Gifts